Janzur or Janzour , also known as Zanzur, is a city in north-western Libya, situated on the Libyan coastline of the Mediterranean Sea, located in the west of the capital Tripoli, and East of Az-Zawiya. Residents of this city are called Janazrah (plural of Janzouri-one who is from Janzour).

Janzour consists of Eight major areas, namely Janzour As-Souq (جنزور السوق) and Janzour Al-Garbiyah (جنزور الغربية) and Janzour Ash-Sharqiya (جنزور الشرقية) and Janzour Al-wasat (جنزور الوسط) and AL-gheiran (الغيران) and An-Njila (النجيلة) and As-Sayad (الصياد) and Alhachan (الحشان).

History

Naming and population 
Indigenous peoples are Mejres (مجريس) and Tasa (تاسا), They are sons of one father claims Wkhian (وخيعن), from the tribe of Houara, but today the city is considered far from tribalism, and mixed from several origins of Houara of sons of Gharyan and Mslath, Misrata and Tarhona and Orfeila, and the families of the tribe of Nafusa and the families of tribe of Zanata, and Arabs of Banu Dabbab.

Janzur is derived from the Latin word "Censor" (In old Latin, C pronounce, such as G, like Greek the ancestor of Latin, which C correspond to Γ (third letter), which Greek is derived from the Phoenician and Phoenician use abjad system (ABCD HWZ...)).

Historical overview

On March 6, 1912, the Italian forces became the first to use airships in war, as two dirigibles dropped bombs on Turkish troops and Libyan Mujahideen encamped at Janzour, from an altitude of 6,000 feet.

Janzour became a Baladiyah that followed the Greater Tripoli Muhafazah, Janzur was part of Jafara District since 2001. Before that it was part of Zawiya District in 1998 and Before that it was part of Tripoli District in 1995 and Before that it was part of Tarabulus Baladiyah in 1987 and Before that it was part of Janzour Baladiyah in 1983.

Agriculture
The area is of great agricultural value because of the winter rain and the mild weather. The palm and olive trees, as well as orange trees used to be widespread in the city; however, due to urban planning, and the dramatic increase of people colonization, a lot of these trees disappeared especially the orange trees. Janzour is becoming a highly urban area, as new hospitals, schools, and roads are being built. Right now, it is home to many significant institutions, including the Libyan Academy, University of Tripoli: Faculty of Arts, School of Medicine, Engineering and Vocational Colleges...etc.

See also
Italo-Turkish War

References

External links
"Janzour - The Mediterranean Elegance" janzour.com
"Janzur, Libya" Falling Rain Genomics, Inc.

Populated coastal places in Libya
Port cities of the Mediterranean Sea
Baladiyat of Libya